Amyntas II was the son of the Persian official Bubares by his Macedonian wife Gygaea. He was named after his maternal grandfather, Amyntas I of Macedon, who ruled Macedonia as a Persian subject since 512/511 BC. Later, king Xerxes I (r. 486-465 BC) gave him the Carian city of Alabanda. Amyntas was possibly the direct successor of the tyrant Aridolis.

References

Sources
 
 

6th-century BC Iranian people
5th-century BC Iranian people
Achaemenid Macedon
Iranian people of Greek descent
5th-century BC deaths
Rulers in the Achaemenid Empire